Pogonocherus dimidiatus is a species of beetle in the family Cerambycidae. It was described by Blessig in 1873. It is known from Russia, China, North Korea, South Korea, and Japan.

References

Pogonocherini
Beetles described in 1873